Urgedra janzeni is a moth of the family Notodontidae first described by James S. Miller and Paul Thiaucourt in 2011. It is found in north-eastern Ecuador.

The length of the forewings is 17-20.5 mm. The ground colour of the forewings is purplish brown, slightly darker toward the outer margin. The ground colour of the hindwings is dirty grey brown, but lighter at the base and along the anal margin.

Etymology
The species is named in honour of Daniel H. Janzen.

References

Moths described in 2011
Notodontidae